Michael James Esper (born December 1, 1975) is an American actor, best known for his stage work.

Early life 
Esper was born in Manhattan and raised in Montclair, New Jersey. He is the son of acting teachers William and Suzanne Esper, of the William Esper Studio. He attended Saint Ann's School in Brooklyn Heights. He attended Rutgers University after attending Oberlin College for one year.

Stage career 
Esper has appeared on Broadway in Sting's The Last Ship, A Man for All Seasons, Green Day's American Idiot and The Lyons. He also starred in the Off-Broadway premieres of Leslye Headland's Assistance, Nicky Silver's The Lyons, and Tony Kushner's The Intelligent Homosexual's Guide to Capitalism and Socialism with a Key to the Scriptures. His voice is included on American Idiot: The Original Broadway Cast Recording as well as the cast album for Lazarus.

After a break from stage work, he returned to New York theater in February 2014 with David Grimm's new play Tales from Red Vienna off-Broadway, opposite Nina Arianda. He followed that by starring in Sting's new musical The Last Ship. The Last Ship began previews on Broadway in September 2014 and ran through January 24, 2015. Esper also appeared in David Bowie and Enda Walsh's new musical Lazarus at New York Theatre Workshop. He was nominated for a 2016 Outer Critics Circle Award for his performance in Lazarus. Esper has also appeared in Tennessee Williams' The Glass Menagerie at the Edinburgh International Festival in 2016 and again at the Duke of York's Theatre in London, which ran until April 29, 2017.

Additional stage credits include Crazy Mary, for which he won the Clarence Derwent Award, Big Bill, subUrbia, Manic Flight Reaction, As You Like It, and The Four Of Us.

Reception 
The New York Daily News described him as a "rising star" and said, "He acts with an emotional openness and authenticity that's as striking as it is uncommon.  Esper's talent is evident whether he's punking out on Broadway in the Green Day musical American Idiot or assuming the cadence and carriage of 16th-century England in A Man for All Seasons."

Acting credits

Stage

Film

Television

References

External links

1976 births
Living people
American male stage actors
American male film actors
American male television actors
Male actors from New York City
Male actors from New Jersey
People from Montclair, New Jersey
Oberlin College alumni
Rutgers University alumni
21st-century American male actors
20th-century American male actors
Saint Ann's School (Brooklyn) alumni